The 2006 Pan American Aerobic Gymnastics Championships were held in San Cristóbal, Venezuela, December 12–17, 2006. The competition was organized by the Venezuelan Gymnastics Federation.

Medalists

References

2006 in gymnastics
International gymnastics competitions hosted by Venezuela
2006 in Venezuelan sport
Pan American Gymnastics Championships